Metisella trisignatus, the three-spot sylph,' is a butterfly in the family Hesperiidae. It is found in Kenya, Tanzania and Zambia.

Subspecies
Metisella trisignatus trisignatus (Kenya: highlands west of the Rift Valley)
Metisella trisignatus tanga Evans, 1937 (highlands of Tanzania, north-eastern Zambia)

References

Butterflies described in 1904
Heteropterinae